An equation in mathematics  is a formula stating that two expressions have the same value.

Equation may also refer to:

Chemical equation, a symbolic representation of a chemical reaction
Equation of time, the difference between solar time, as shown by a sundial, and mean time, as shown by a clock that runs at constant speed
Equation clock, a clock that contains a mechanism that embodies the equation of time, so the clock shows solar time
Equation of state, a relationship between physical conditions and the state of a material
Equation (band), an English folk band formed in 1996
Equation Group, a computer espionage group
"The Equation", a 2008 episode of Fringe
"[Equation]" (ΔMi−1 = −αΣn=1NDi[n] [Σj∈C[i]Fji[n − 1] + Fexti[n−1]]), the first B-side of "Windowlicker" by Aphex Twin, also known as "[Formula]"

See also
List of equations